Patriarch Ignatius III may refer to:

Ignatius III David, Syriac Orthodox Patriarch of Antioch in 1222–1252
Ignatius III Atiyah,  Melkite Patriarch of Antioch in 1619–1634